The Luxembourgish referendum on the Treaty establishing a Constitution for Europe is a referendum that was held on 10 July 2005 to decide whether Luxembourg should ratify the proposed Constitution of the European Union.

56.52% of the 220,717 voters said "yes". Voting bureaus were open from 8am till 2pm.

Luxembourg was the 13th EU member state to approve the EU treaty. It was the second referendum with a vote in favor of the EU treaty (after Spain) and the first referendum since the French and the Dutch voters rejected the EU treaty. Jean-Claude Juncker, Luxembourgish PM, expected a close vote. The last opinion poll a month before the referendum indicated a small advantage for the "yes", but a substantial 16% of non-decided.

The referendum was Luxembourg's first since 1937. Luxembourg is traditionally regarded as one of the EU's most enthusiastic member states, and most prominent political figures support the Constitution, with both the governing coalition and the main opposition parties campaigning for a 'yes' vote.

The poll was consultative in nature but the parliament agreed to abide by the people's majority vote.  Prime Minister Jean-Claude Juncker had said he would resign if the referendum resulted in a 'no' vote. 

On 28 June 2005, Luxembourg's parliament approved the constitution in advance of the referendum.

Analysis
A study  of the campaign and referendum results by the political scientists of the University of Luxembourg.

Results

External links
 Official results
 BBC: EU apathy reigns in Luxembourg 29 October 2004

Referendums in Luxembourg
Referendum on the European Constitution, Luxembourg
Luxembourg European Constitution referendum
Referendum on the European Constitution
Luxembourg European Constitution referendum
Luxembourg European Constitution referendum
Luxembourg European Constitution referendum
Luxembourg European Constitution referendum